BKP may refer to:

Political parties
 United Cyprus Party
 Bulgarian Communist Party
 Belarusian Peasant Party
 Bhutan Kuen-Nyam Party

Transport
 Bangkok Airways (ICAO: BKP)
 Bangkok Port (ท่าเรือกรุงเทพ), a maritime port in Thailand
 Bakhtiyarpur Junction railway station (station code: BKP), India
 Batarejnyj kommandnyj punkt, a BTR-80 variant

Other
 Bala language (ISO 693-3: bkp), a Bantu language
 Bingham's Kennebec Purchase; see Historical United States Census totals for Somerset County, Maine
 Bromoketoprogesterone, a progestin medication
 Boss Key Productions, a video game studio
 Bounded knapsack problem, a problem in combinatorial optimization